The 2019 Vuelta a España was a three-week Grand Tour cycling stage race that took place in Spain, Andorra and France between 24 August and 15 September 2019. The race was the 74th edition of the Vuelta a España and is the final Grand Tour of the 2019 cycling season. The race started with a team time trial in Torrevieja on the Costa Blanca.

 
Along with the overall, Roglič also took the points classification. Geoffrey Bouchard of  won the mountains classification, while Pogačar was the best young rider.

Teams

The 18 UCI WorldTeams are automatically invited to the race. In addition, four Professional Continental teams obtained a wildcard, bringing the number of teams to 22.

The teams that entered the race were:

UCI WorldTeams

 
 
 
 
 
 
 
 
 
 
 
 
 
 
 
 
 
 

UCI Professional Continental teams

Pre-race favourites 
The winner of the 2018 Vuelta a España, Simon Yates, had decided to not defend his title after riding in the 2019 Giro d'Italia and Tour de France. Steven Kruijswijk, Primož Roglič (Team Jumbo-Visma), Miguel Ángel López, Jakob Fuglsang (Astana) and Nairo Quintana (Movistar Team) were considered among the pre-race favourites. Fernando Gaviria (UAE Team Emirates) and Sam Bennett (Bora-Hansgrohe) were considered as potential stage winners and points classification contenders.
Kruijswijk climbed on the podium of the 2019 Tour de France, while his team partner Roglič got third at the 2019 Giro d'Italia. López was on the podium on both the 2018 Giro d'Italia and the 2018 Vuelta a España.

There were three previous winners among the participating cyclists: Alejandro Valverde (2009), Fabio Aru (2015) and Nairo Quintana (2016). Valverde (Movistar Team) and Thomas De Gendt (Lotto-Soudal) also attempted to defend their points and mountain classification titles.

Route and stages

Classification leadership 

The Vuelta a España has four individual classifications, for which jerseys were awarded daily to the leading rider, as well as a team competition. The primary classification is the general classification, which is calculated by adding each rider's finishing times on each stage. Time bonuses were awarded at the end of every stage apart from the team time trial (stage 1) and individual time trial (stage 10). The rider with the lowest cumulative time is the leader of the general classification, and wears the red jersey. The leader of the general classification at the end of the race is considered the overall winner of the Vuelta a España.

The second classification is the points classification. Riders receive points for finishing among the highest placed in a stage finish, or in intermediate sprints during the stages. The points available for each stage finish are determined by the stage's type. The leader is identified by a green jersey.

The next classification is the mountains classification. Points are awarded to the riders that reach the summit of the most difficult climbs first. The climbs are categorized, in order of increasing difficulty, third-, second-, and first- and special-category. The leader wears white jersey with blue polka dots.

The final of the individual classifications is the young rider classification, which is calculated by adding each rider's finishing times on each stage for each rider born on or after 1 January 1994. The rider with the lowest cumulative time is the leader of the young rider classification, and wears the white jersey.

There is also the team classification. After each stage, the times of the three highest finishers of each team are added together. The victory is awarded to the team with the lowest cumulative time at the end of the event.

In addition, there is one individual award: the combativity award. This award is given after each stage (excluding the team time trial and individual time trial) to the rider "who displayed the most generous effort and best sporting spirit." The daily winner wears a green number bib the following stage. At the end of the Vuelta, a jury decides the top three riders for the “Most Combative Rider of
La Vuelta”, with a public vote deciding the victor.

 On stage two, Dario Cataldo and Jakob Fuglsang, who were second in the general classification, wore the green jersey and white with blue polka-dot jersey respectively, although no points were awarded during the opening team time trial stage for either ranking. 
 On stage two, James Knox, who was second in the young rider classification, wore the white jersey, because first placed Miguel Ángel López wore the red jersey as leader of the general classification. On stages six and eight, Tadej Pogačar wore the white jersey for the same reason.
 On stage ten, Primož Roglič, who was second in the points classification, wore the green jersey, because first placed Nairo Quintana wore the red jersey as leader of the general classification.
 On stages eleven, twelve, and thirteen, Nairo Quintana, who was second in the points classification, wore the green jersey, because first placed Primož Roglič wore the red jersey as leader of the general classification. On stage nineteen, Tadej Pogačar wore the green jersey for the same reason.
 On stages fourteen and fifteen, Nairo Quintana, who was third in the points classification, wore the green jersey, because first placed Primož Roglič wore the red jersey as leader of the general classification, and second placed Tadej Pogačar wore the white jersey as leader of the young rider classification.
 On stages sixteen and seventeen, Nairo Quintana, who was fourth in the points classification, wore the green jersey, because first placed Primož Roglič  wore the red jersey as leader of the general classification, second placed Tadej Pogačar wore the white jersey as leader of the young rider classification, and third placed Alejandro Valverde wore the World Champion jersey.
 On stage eighteen, Nairo Quintana, who was fourth in the points classification, wore the green jersey, because first placed Primož Roglič  wore the red jersey as leader of the general classification, second placed Sam Bennett wore the Irish National Road Race Champion jersey, and third placed Tadej Pogačar wore the white jersey as leader of the young rider classification.
 On stage nineteen, Tadej Pogačar, who was second in the points classification, wore the green jersey, because first placed Primož Roglič  wore the red jersey as leader of the general classification.
 On stage twenty, Tadej Pogačar, who was fourth in the points classification, wore the green jersey, because first placed Primož Roglič wore the red jersey as leader of the general classification, second placed Sam Bennett wore the Irish National Road Race Champion jersey, and third placed Alejandro Valverde wore the World Champion jersey.
 On stage twenty-one, Nairo Quintana, who was fifth in the points classification, wore the green jersey, because first placed Primož Roglič wore the red jersey as leader of the general classification, second placed Tadej Pogačar wore the white jersey as leader of the young rider classification, third placed Alejandro Valverde wore the World Champion jersey, and fourth placed Sam Bennett wore the Irish National Road Race Champion jersey.

Final classification standings

General classification

Points classification

Mountains classification

Young rider classification

Team classification

References

Sources

External links
 

 
2019
2019 UCI World Tour
2019 in Spanish road cycling
August 2019 sports events in Spain
September 2019 sports events in Spain
Vuelta a Espana